Don Torcuato is a town in the Tigre Partido of the urban agglomeration of Greater Buenos Aires, Argentina. It is named after Marcelo Torcuato de Alvear, ex-President of Argentina, as he had his ranch and residency there. Most of the streets are named after his immediate family and his governmental staff.

Don Torcuato has two train stations on the Belgrano Norte Line with direct connection to Buenos Aires, and also the nearby Pascual Palazzo highway, part of the Pan-American Highway. It formerly had a general aviation airfield, bearing the same name (Don Torcuato - ICAO:SADD), that was closed in January 2006.

Climate

Sports
Don Torcuato is known to be the home of Hindu Club, Buenos Aires most recent rugby tournament champion.

References

External links
Local website

Local website

Populated places in Buenos Aires Province
Tigre Partido
Cities in Argentina